Naperville is a train station in Naperville, Illinois, served by Amtrak, the national railroad passenger system. Amtrak trains stopping at the Naperville station include the California Zephyr, Illinois Zephyr, Carl Sandburg and Southwest Chief. It is also one of two stations in Naperville that serves Metra's BNSF commuter line, and an abundance of Pace bus routes. Naperville station was originally built in 1910 by the Chicago, Burlington and Quincy Railroad. On April 26, 1946, the station was the site of a collision between the CB&Q's Exposition Flyer and Advance Flyer. On April 26, 2014, a memorial entitled Tragedy to Triumph was dedicated at the train station. The sculpture by Paul Kuhn is dedicated not only to the crash victims but also to the rescuers at the site.

As of 2018, Naperville has an average of 4,015 weekday boardings for Metra trains. This makes the station the second busiest of Metra's 236 non-downtown stations, after  station. The station also serves 53,000 Amtrak passengers annually.

Bus connections
Pace
 530 West Galena–Naperville Metra Station
 714 College of DuPage–Naperville–Wheaton Connector 
 722 Ogden Avenue

Notes

External links

Naperville Amtrak & Metra Station (USA Rail Guide – Train Web)
Station from Google Maps Street View

Amtrak stations in Illinois
Metra stations in Illinois
Former Chicago, Burlington and Quincy Railroad stations
Buildings and structures in Naperville, Illinois
Railway stations in the United States opened in 1910
Transportation in Naperville, Illinois
Railway stations in DuPage County, Illinois
Bus stations in Illinois